John Craig (1663 – 11 October 1731) was a Scottish mathematician and theologian.

Biography
Born in Dumfries and educated at the University of Edinburgh, Craig moved to England and became a vicar in the Church of England.

A friend of Isaac Newton, he wrote several minor works about the new calculus.

He was elected Fellow of the Royal Society in 1711.

Mathematical Principles of Christian Theology
He is known for his book Theologiae Christianae Principia Mathematica (Mathematical Principles of Christian Theology), published in 1698.

In the aforementioned book, Craig presents a formula that describes how the probability of a historical event depends on the number of primary witnesses, on the chain of transmission through secondary witnesses, on the elapsed time and on the spatial distance. Using this formula, Craig derived that the probability of the story of Jesus would reach 0 in the year 3150. This year he interpreted as the Second Coming of Christ because of verse 18:8 in the Gospel of Luke.

His work was poorly received and controversial at the time. Several later mathematicians complained about his imprecise use of probability and the unsupported derivation of his formula. Stephen Stigler, in his 1999 book (see references, below) gave a more favorable interpretation, pointing out that some of Craig's reasoning can be justified if his "probability" is interpreted as the log-likelihood ratio.

Logarithms
Craig was involved in developing the concept of Hyperbolic logarithm and in 1710 published “Logarithmotechnica generalis” in the Proceedings of the Royal Society. By way  of illustration he gives the Mercator series for the logarithm (denoted l.) without mention of radius of convergence: 
“Exemplar 1. Assumatur a = y, unde per Canonum generalum 
cujus differentials est  & hujus integralis per Seriem infinitum expressa dat 
"

Works
 1698: Logarithmic quadrature (in Latin) Philosophical Transactions of the Royal Society
 1703: Specimen of determining quadrature of figures (in Latin), Philosophical Transactions of the Royal Society #284 via Biodiversity Heritage Library
 1710: Method of making logarithms (in Latin), Philosophical Transactions of the Royal Society

References

Bibliography
  S. M. Stigler, Statistics on the Table, Chapter 13, Harvard University Press, (1999).
 J. F. Scott, Dictionary of Scientific Biography (New York 1970–1990).
 . 
 R. Nash, John Craige's mathematical principles of Christian theology (1991).
 M. Cantor, Vorlesungen über Geschichte der Mathematik III (Leipzig, 1896), 52, 188.
 Dictionary of National Biography (London, 1917).
 S. M. Stigler, John Craig and the probability of history: from the death of Christ to the birth of Laplace, Journal of the American Statistical Association 81 (1986), 879–887.

External links
 MacTutor: John Craig
 Significant Scots: John Craig

1663 births
1731 deaths
People from Dumfries
Anglo-Scots
18th-century English Anglican priests
Scottish mathematicians
17th-century Scottish mathematicians
18th-century Scottish mathematicians
Fellows of the Royal Society
Scottish non-fiction writers
Alumni of the University of Edinburgh
Scottish Episcopalians